The Patrick and Beatrice Haggerty Museum of Art, sometimes referred to simply as "the Haggerty", is located at 13th and Clybourn Streets on the campus of Marquette University in downtown Milwaukee, Wisconsin, United States. The museum opened in 1984 following a university collaborative effort that was chaired by professor Curtis L. Carter. The construction site was decorated by a mural called Construction Fence by American artist and social activist, Keith Haring.

The construction of the museum was made possible by a donation from alumnus and co-founder of Texas Instruments, Inc., Patrick E. Haggerty, and his wife, Beatrice, for whom the museum is named. Haggerty and his wife donated an art collection to the university. The current director is Susan Longhenry.

Permanent collection 
The Haggerty Museum of Art has a permanent collection of over 10,000 paintings, sculptures, photographs and other visual art pieces. Highlights include:

Gustave Caillebotte, La Machine de Marly, ca. 1875
Jean-Baptiste Carpeaux, Figaro, 1873
Marc Chagall, a set of 105 colored etchings known as The Bible Series
Pieter Claeissens, Madonna and Child, 1550.
Salvador Dalí's Madonna of Port Lligat, 1948. The museum also owns a portfolio of Dalí's Zodiac series. The portfolio is the 32nd of 50 editions.
Otto Dix, From the Catacombs in Palermo I, ca. 1923–24
Jacob Lawrence, Birth, 1948
Roy Lichtenstein
Nicolaes Maes, Portrait of Three Children as Ceres, Ganymede and Diana, 1673
Gilles Mostaert, "Entry Into Jerusalem"
Henri Toulouse-Lautrec, Divan Japonais, 1892–93
Francesco Trevisiani, "Saint Peter in Penitence"
Carle van Loo, The Resurrection (La résurrection du Christ), 1734
Jacques Villon, Maternité, c. 1948, and Prometheus Liberated from his Chains, 1956
Andy Warhol, Marilyn, 1967, as well as Liz, 1964; New England Clam Chowder; and Tomato Beef Noodle-Os.

Past exhibits 
Past exhibits at the Haggerty Museum of Art include the works of the following artists:

Jasper Johns
Roy Lichtenstein
Claes Oldenburg
Sable Elyse Smith
Jeffrey Gibson
María Magdalena Campos-Pons
Frank Stella
J.R.R. Tolkien
Ellsworth Kelly
Ray Parker, American abstract expressionist

Selected collection highlights

See also
Rainbow Machine
Ruins X
Ex Stasis (sculpture)

References

External links 
Haggerty Museum of Art
Marquette University
Haggerty Museum of Art within Google Arts & Culture

Marquette University
University museums in Wisconsin
Art museums and galleries in Wisconsin
Museums in Milwaukee
Art museums established in 1984
1984 establishments in Wisconsin